Tereza Jančová (born 31 March 1999) is a former alpine skier from Slovakia. She competed for Slovakia at the FIS Alpine World Ski Championships 2017, winning silver in the team event. Jančová was named 'most successful athlete in Zvolen' in 2017, and was also named as the winner in the junior category in 2019. She announced her retirement in March 2019, after having won the Slovak championship slalom event the same month.

References

1999 births
Living people
Sportspeople from Zvolen
Slovak female alpine skiers
Alpine skiers at the 2016 Winter Youth Olympics